is the 2nd single by Japanese girl group SKE48, their first under the Crown Gold label. It reached the 3rd place on the weekly Oricon Singles Chart and, as of July 5, 2010 (issue date), has sold 51,180 copies.

Members

"Aozora Kataomoi" 
 Team S: Jurina Matsui, Rena Matsui, Kumi Yagami, Yukiko Kinoshita
 Team KII: Shiori Ogiso, Akane Takayanagi, Manatsu Mukaida

"Bungee Sengen" 
Team BLT
 Team S: Mizuki Kuwabara, Haruka Ono, Rikako Hirata, Masana Oya, Shiori Takada, Akari Suda, Kanako Hiramatsu
 Team KII: Airi Furukawa, Anna Ishida, Rina Matsumoto
 Kenkyuusei: Erika Yamada

References

2010 singles
Japanese-language songs
Songs with lyrics by Yasushi Akimoto
SKE48 songs
2010 songs